Leigh Brooklyn (formerly Leigh Bongiorno and Wendy Leigh Knapp; born 1987) is an American figurative artist.

Life
Wendy Leigh Knapp was born and raised in Cleveland, Ohio. She currently lives and works in her hometown of Cleveland.

Education 
She began her formal studies in 2005 when she studied with a local portrait artist in Cleveland. In 2006, she received mention for her artwork in National VFW Women's Auxiliary Magazine. Brooklyn enrolled in the Columbus College of Art and Design in 2006 but later transferred to the Cleveland Institute of Art after being inspired by the work of forensic artists who helped officials solve a missing-person's case. Brooklyn earned a degree in Biomedical Illustration in 2011.

Career 
She explored biomedical illustration as a profession and worked with several hospitals, museums, and research facilities including the Cleveland Clinic. She ultimately decided not to pursue this career path, and instead she chose to explore oil painting with figurative or portrait subjects. She uses her art to showcase marginalized communities to uplift them and bring attention to their struggles, including portraits of transgender individuals or homeless people. She focuses her work on more controversial topics like gender, sex, race, and religion to encourage respect and appreciation for all communities.

In June 2018, as Leigh Bongiorno, she was chosen for an artistic project for the Cleveland RTA as a part of the Inter|Urban Art Project. The focus of her work shifted to women empowerment after tumultuous events in her personal life. She learned how to sculpta and weld to incorpate 3D elements into her works focusing on creating an army of women fighting for women.

In 2020 Brooklyn created a series of 10 drawings entitled Love Bomb.

References

1987 births
Living people
21st-century American women artists
Artists from Cleveland
Cleveland Institute of Art alumni